Bodenwerder was a Samtgemeinde ("collective municipality") in the district of Holzminden, in Lower Saxony, Germany. Its seat was in the town Bodenwerder. On 1 January 2010, it merged with the former Samtgemeinde Polle to form the new Samtgemeinde Bodenwerder-Polle.

The Samtgemeinde Bodenwerder consisted of the following municipalities:

 Bodenwerder
 Halle 
 Hehlen 
 Heyen
 Kirchbrak
 Pegestorf

Former Samtgemeinden in Lower Saxony